The 1942 CCNY Beavers football team was an American football team that represented the City College of New York (CCNY) as an independent during the 1942 college football season. In their first season under head coach Doc Alexander, the team compiled a 1–7–1 record.

Schedule

References

CCNY
CCNY Beavers football seasons
CCNY Beavers football